Ceragioli may refer to :

People
Enzo Ceragioli, 20th-century Italian conductor, composer, arranger, and pianist
Giorgio Ceragioli 20th-century Italian engineer, professor and activist
Giorgio Ceragioli, early 20th-century Italian painter and sculptor
Peter A. Ceragioli Jr. (1932–2004), American West Coast jazz pianist and accordionist

Places
133528 Ceragioli,  asteroid of the Koronis family